Boana is a genus of frogs in the family Hylidae. They are commonly known as gladiator frogs, gladiator treefrogs or Wagler Neotropical treefrogs. These frogs are distributed in the tropical Central and South America from Nicaragua to Argentina, as well as in the Caribbean (Trinidad and Tobago).

This genus was resurrected following a major revision of Hylidae when some 70 species previously placed in the genus Hyla were moved to this genus. Since then, many new species have also been described.

Species
As of April, 2020, there are 95 species recognised in this genus:

In addition, Hyla palliata and Hypsiboas hypselops are included here as incertae sedis.

References

External links

 
Cophomantinae
Amphibian genera
Amphibians of the Caribbean
Amphibians of Central America
Amphibians of South America
Taxa named by John Edward Gray